Diaaeldin Kamal Gouda Abdelmottaleb (born 2 May 1993) is a heavyweight freestyle wrestler from Egypt. In 2016 he won the African Championships and competed at the Rio Olympics, losing in the second bout to Komeil Ghasemi.

He qualified at the 2021 African & Oceania Wrestling Olympic Qualification Tournament to represent Egypt at the 2020 Summer Olympics in Tokyo, Japan.

References

External links

 

1993 births
Living people
Egyptian male sport wrestlers
Olympic wrestlers of Egypt
Wrestlers at the 2016 Summer Olympics
Wrestlers at the 2020 Summer Olympics
African Wrestling Championships medalists
21st-century Egyptian people